Pakistan participated in the 2010 Asian Games held in Guangzhou, China on 12–27 November 2010. These games provided a field hockey (men) gold after 20 years at the Asian Games, the country's eighth overall, and also its first major title since winning the 1994 World Cup in Sydney, Australia. It also saw Pakistan become gold medallist in the inaugural events of cricket (women) and squash (men's team). Pakistan had won the inaugural squash singles (men's) event at the 1998 Asian Games in Bangkok, Thailand.

Opening ceremony
Originally, the Commonwealth Games gold medalist Azhar Hussain was nominated to carry the flag, but a conflict with his training schedule forced the officials to nominate the country's field hockey captain, Zeeshan Ashraf instead. Pakistan's president, Asif Ali Zardari, attended the opening ceremony as a guest of the Chinese.

Medalists

Baseball 

The Pakistan baseball team has qualified for the Asian Games after winning the Asia Cup qualifiers in Islamabad this year.

Men

Group B

13 November 2010 – 12:00

14 November 2010 – 13:00

16 November 2010 12:00

Boxing

Men

Officials

Cricket

Pakistan will send both men's and women's teams to the Games.

Men
The following players were selected to participate:

 Khalid Latif (Captain)
 Sharjeel Khan
 Sheharyar Ghani
 Azeem Ghumman
 Akbar-ur-Rehman
 Naeemuddin
 Naeem Anjum
 Usman Qadir
 Sarmad Bhatti
 Aizaz Cheema
 Lal Kumar
 Mohammad Irshad
 Raza Hasan
 Bilawal Bhatti
 Jalat Khan

Knockout stage
{{Round8-with third

|22 November ||183/1||55/9
|23 November ||66/2||63/10
|23 November ||150/7||80/10
|24 November ||73/8||72/10

|25 November ||103/7||125/8
|25 November ||102/5||101/10

|26 November ||118/8||119/5|26 November ||141/4||135/10
}}

Quarterfinals

Semifinals

Bronze-medal match

Women
The following players were selected to participate:

 Sana Mir (Captain)
 Marina Iqbal (Vice Captain),
 Syeda Nain Fatima Abidi
 Bismah Maroof
 Mariam Hasan Shah
 Javeria Khan
 Nida Rashid Dar
 Kanwal Naz
 Nahida Khan
 Syeda Batool Fatima Naqvi (WK)
 Shumaila Qureshi
 Asmavia Iqbal Khokar
 Kainat Imtiaz
 Sania KhanOfficialsRound of 16

Quarterfinals

Semifinals

Finals

Cue sports

Men

Snooker

SnookerOfficialsFootball

Initially, Pakistan was not sending a team to compete in these games, but after the President of Pakistan Football Federation, Makhdoom Faisal Saleh Hayat committed to bearing the expenses of the team, it was once again included in the Games.Pakistan to face Oman in Asian Games football Dawn 9 October 2010. Retrieved 10 October 2010 Pakistan is in Group F with Oman, Thailand and Maldives.

MenGoalkeepers (2)
Amir Gul (NBP)
Jaffar Khan (Army) (CAPT)Defenders (6)
Umer Farooq (KESC)
Samar Ishaq (KRL) (VC)
Ahsan Ullah (PEL)
Aurangzaib (HBL)
Muhammad Ahmed (WAPDA)
Atif Bashir (Barry Town)Midfielders (7)
Mehmood Khan (KRL)
Yasir Afridi (KRL)
Muhammad Adil (KRL)
Muhammad Tauseef (Islamabad)
Abbas Ali (NBP)
Zain Ullah (WAPDA)
Faisal Iqbal (NBP)Strikers (5)
Kalim Ullah Khan (KRL)
Rizwan Asif (KRL)
Saddam Hussain (NBP)
Shani Qayum ( Sheffield Wednesday Youth)
Faraz Ahmed (Nottingham)OfficialsGroup F

Field hockey

Pakistan will hold a training camp for the team at Lahore from 24 October until the beginning of the Games. PHF announced a 16-member team on 3 November, which saw the return of Sohail Abbas and Salman Akbar and the retention of Zeeshan Ashraf as captain.

Men
 Zeeshan Ashraf (captain)
 Muhammad Imran (vice-captain)
 Salman Akbar (goal keeper)
 Sohail Abbas
 Muhammad Irfan
 Waseem Ahmad
 Muhammad Rashid
 Fareed Ahmad
 Muhammad Tousiq
 Abdul Haseem Khan
 Rehan Butt
 Shakeel Abbasi
 Shafqat Rasool
 Muhammad Zubair
 Mohammad Waqas Sharif
 Mohammad RizwanOfficialsPool B

First to fourth place classification

Semifinals

Finals

Judo

Men

Women

Kabaddi

Men
 Maqsood Ali
 Muhammad Ali
 Nasir Ali
 Wajid Ali
 Muhammad Arshad
 Akhlaq Hussain
 Ibrar Hussain
 Muhammad Khalid
 Abrar Khan
 Abdul Mukhtar
 Wasim Sajjad
 Atif Waheed

Group B

22 November

23 November

24 November

Knockout round

Karate

Men

Sailing

Men
 Muhammad Yousaf – Laser
 Xerxes byram avari – Double Handed Dinghy 470
 Mehboob Nil –  Double Handed Dinghy 470
 Muhammad Sajjad – Mistral

Shooting

Pistol – Men

Pistol – Women

Rifle – Women

Squash

Men

Singles

Team
 Aamir Atlas Khan
 Danish Atlas Khan
 Farhan Mehboob
 Yasir Butt

Group A

Knockout round

Women

Singles

Team
 Maria Toorpaki Wazir
 Saima Shoukat
 Zoya Khalid

Group B

Tennis

Men

Volleyball

Men

Group A

|}

|}

Group G

|}

|}

9th–12th-place semifinals

|}

9th-place game

|}

Weightlifting

Men

Wrestling

Freestyle – MenOfficials'''

Wushu

Men

See also
2010 Asian Games

References

Nations at the 2010 Asian Games
2010
Asian Games